Crampe en Masse is the name of the first album by the Québécois comedy duo Crampe en masse.

Track listing

1998 albums
Crampe en masse albums
1990s comedy albums